Kinta may refer to:
 Kinta District, Malaysia
 Kinta, Benin
 Kinta, Oklahoma
 Kinta River
 Kinta Tamaoka
 Kinta Kellas
 Kinta 1881
 Kinta rubber works